Tmesisternus beehleri is a species of beetle in the family Cerambycidae. It was described by Gressitt in 1984.

References

beehleri
Beetles described in 1984